Jalizi-ye Pain (also Romanized as Jalīzī-ye Pā'īn; also known as ‘Alī Na‘īr (Persian: علي نعير) and Jalīzī-ye ‘Alī Naşīr) is a village in Nahr-e Anbar Rural District, Musian District, Dehloran County, Ilam Province, Iran. At the 2006 census, its population was 198, in 32 families. The village is populated by Arabs.

References 

Populated places in Dehloran County
Arab settlements in llam Province